The History of the Jews in Colombia begins in the Spanish colonial period with the arrival of the first Jews during the Spanish colonization of the Americas.

History 

"New Christians", or Marranos, fled the Iberian peninsula to escape persecution and seek religious freedom during the 16th and 17th centuries. It is estimated that some reached northern areas of Colombia, which at the time was known as New Granada. Most if not all of these people assimilated into Colombian society. Some continue to practice Jewish rituals as family traditions.

In the 18th century, practicing Spanish and Portuguese Jews came from Jamaica and Curaçao, where they had flourished under English and Dutch rule. These Jews started practicing their religion openly in Colombia at the end of the 18th century, although it was not officially legal to do so, given the established Catholic Church. After independence, Judaism was recognized as a legal religion. The government granted the Jews land for a cemetery.

Many Jews who came during the 18th and 19th centuries achieved prominent positions in Colombian society. Some married local women and felt they had to abandon or diminish their Jewish identity. These included author Jorge Isaacs of English Jewish ancestry, the industrialist James Martin Eder (who adopted the more Christian name of Santiago Eder when he translated his name to Spanish) born into the Latvian Jewish community, as well as the De Lima, Salazar, Espinoza, Arias, Ramirez, Perez and Lobo families of Antillean Sephardim. Coincidentally, these persons and their families settled in the Cauca Valley region of Colombia. They have continued to be influential members of society in cities such as Cali. Over the generations most of their descendants were raised as secular Christians.

During the early part of the 20th century, numerous Sephardic Jewish immigrants came from Greece, Turkey, North Africa and Syria. Shortly after, Jewish immigrants began to arrive from Eastern Europe. A wave of Ashkenazi immigrants came after the rise of Nazism in 1933 and the imposition of anti-Semitic laws and practices, followed by as many as 17,000 German Jews. From 1939 until the end of World War II, immigration was put to a halt by anti-immigrant feelings in the country and restrictions on immigration from Germany. 

Colombia asked Germans who were on the U.S. blacklist to leave and allowed Jewish refugees in the country illegally to stay. President Laureano Gómez actively supported and helped the Jewish Community through this troubling time. The Jewish population increased dramatically in the 1950s and 1960s, and institutions such as synagogues, schools and social clubs were established throughout the largest cities in the country. Rabbi Eliezer Roitblatt was the first rabbi to arrive in Colombia in 1946, and served as its first Ashkenazi Chief Rabbi. In the 1950s, a Sephardic Jewish community originating in particular from Syria, Turkey and Egypt was created with Rabbi David Sharbani serving as the Sephardic Chief Rabbi.

A wave of kidnappings during the last decade of the 20th century led some members of Colombia's Jewish community to emigrate. Most settled in Miami and other parts of the United States. Successes in the nation's Democratic Security Policy has encouraged citizens to return; it has drastically reduced violence in the rural areas and criminality rates in urban areas, as well as in spurring the economy. The situation in Colombia has improved to the extent that many Venezuelan Jews are now seeking refuge in Colombia.

Modern Community

As of the 21st century, approximately 8,000 practicing Jews live in Colombia. Most of them are concentrated in Bogotá, with about 3,500 members, and Cali, with about 1,000 members. New communities are also found in Barranquilla and Medellín. Very few Jews practice religious observance; among those who do, the majority are Orthodox. German Jewish communities in Bogota and Cali also preserve much of their traditions. 

Smaller communities are found in Cartagena and the island of San Andres. There are approximately 10 official synagogues throughout the country. In Bogotá, the Ashkenazi, Sephardic, and German Jews each run their own religious and cultural institutions. The Confederación de Asociaciones Judías de Colombia, located in Bogotá, is the central organization that coordinates Jews and Jewish institutions in Colombia.

In the new millennium, after years of study, a group of Colombians with Jewish ancestry formally converted to Judaism in order to be accepted as Jews according to the halakha.

See also

 History of the Jews in Latin America and the Caribbean

References

External links

 
Judaism in South America